Àmbit metropolità de Barcelona is one of the seven territories defined by the Regional Plan of Catalonia. It is located in the central coast of Catalonia, in Barcelona (capital city of Catalonia) and its influence area.

It is formed of five comarques: Baix Llobregat, Barcelonès,  Maresme, Vallès Occidental and Vallès Oriental. It has been suggested by local authorities that Alt Penedès and Garraf should form a separate administrative entity called Vegueria del Penedès, as Penedès was a historical territory, or vegueria, with two comarques: Baix Penedès (Camp de Tarragona) and Anoia (Comarques Centrals). To a large extent coincides with the Barcelona metropolitan area.

Àmbit metropolità is the most populous vegueria with 5,012,961 inhabitants (2010), and a density of 1,549 inhabitants/km2.

Vegueria

The vegueria was a feudal land division in the Principality of Catalonia, Kingdom of Sardinia, and Duchy of Athens during the Middle Ages and into the Modern Era until the Nueva Planta decrees of 1716. It was the primary division of a county in Catalonia and the basic territorial entity of government in Sardinia and Athens after those countries became part of the Crown of Aragon. The office of a veguer was called a "vigeriate" (Latin: vigeriatus).

In 1936, Catalonia was reconstituted into comarques. Although these were quickly abolished in 1939 they were reconstituted again in 1987.

Each comarca was grouped with two to four others into a vegueria, of which there were nine, with their capitals at Barcelona, Girona, Tremp, Vic, Manresa, Lleida, Reus, Tarragona, and Tortosa.

Since the 1987 reconstitution it has been decided that Vegueries be formally re-established in 2011. Under the 2006 Statute of Autonomy of Catalonia, the four provinces which make up Catalonia are due to be replaced by seven vegueries, which will also take over many of the functions of the comarques. As of October 2010, whereas the final boundaries of the new vegueries have yet to be formally approved, they are expected to incorporate largely historical boundaries: Àmbit metropolità de Barcelona, Alt Pirineu i Aran, Camp de Tarragona, Comarques Centrals, Comarques Gironines, Ponent (or Lleida) and Terres de l'Ebre.

See also
Catalonia
Comarques of Catalonia
Barcelona metropolitan area

 Urban planning of Barcelona

References

External links
Statistical Institute of Catalonia
National Statistics Institute of Spain

 
Geography of Catalonia